Ishëm is a former municipality in the Durrës County, northwestern Albania. At the 2015 local government reform it became a subdivision of the municipality Durrës. The population at the 2011 census was 5,001. Ishëm Castle is located in the municipal unit.

Famous peoples
 Ibrahim Kodra

Gallery

See
 Ishëm (river)
 Ishëm Castle
 Rodoni Castle
 Cape of Rodon
 St. Anthony Church, Durrës

References 

Administrative units of Durrës
Former municipalities in Durrës County
Populated places disestablished in 2015